1931 general election may refer to:

1931 New Zealand general election
1931 Spanish general election
1931 United Kingdom general election